The Maryland Military Department (MMD) is a department of the State of Maryland directed by the adjutant general of Maryland. 

The Maryland Military Department consists of the:
State Operations section, which manages fiscal and administrative duties
Maryland Army National Guard
Maryland Air National Guard 
Maryland Defense Force
Maryland Emergency Management Agency
The MMD's mission is to provide supplemental services to the Maryland National Guard with the governor of Maryland as its commander-in-chief.

References

External links
Maryland Army National Guard Homepage
Maryland Air National Guard Homepage
Maryland Defense Force Homepage
Bibliography of Maryland Army National Guard History compiled by the United States Army Center of Military History

 
Military in Maryland